This is a list of Singapore's public art accessible in an outdoor public space.

References

External links
 Public Artworks – directory at National Arts Council

 
Arts in Singapore
Public art in Singapore
Tourist attractions in Singapore